These are the songs that reached number one on the Top 100 Best Sellers chart in 1959 as published by Cash Box magazine.

See also
1959 in music
List of Hot 100 number-one singles of 1959 (U.S.)

References
http://www.cashboxmagazine.com/archives/50s_files/1959.html

1959
1959 record charts
1959 in American music